Khobeyneh may refer to:
 Khobeyneh-ye Olya
 Khobeyneh-ye Sofla